Robert Trotter (7 March 1930 – 12 August 2013) was a Scottish actor, director, and photographer.

Biography
Robert Trotter was born in Dumbarton, Scotland, on 7 March 1930. After completing national service in the 1950s, he became an English teacher at Bellahouston Academy in Glasgow. Following his departure from the academy, he was a lecturer in drama at Glasgow University from 1964 to 1971.

Trotter played an active role in the Scottish arts in the 1960s, working on stage, radio, and television. His work reached a worldwide audience when he joined the cast of the long-running TV drama Take the High Road in 1982.

In the 1990s, he started to pursue his lifelong interest in photography. In 2001, he published a collection of photographs from Glasgow and New York called Sing the City. The archive at Glasgow School of Art contains 300 of his photos, where they are currently on display to the public.

Theatre
Royal Court Theatre Upstairs, London
 Bright Scene Fading   - Tom Gallacher
King's Head Theatre Club, London
Recital - Tom Gallacher
Traverse Theatre, Edinburgh
The Gay Gorbals  - Hector MacMillan   
Every Good Boy Deserves Favour - Tom Stoppard
Pitlochry Festival Theatre
 A Midsummer Night's Dream  - Shakespeare
Hobson's Choice - Harold Brighouse
Babes in the Wood  - James Bridie

Dundee Repertory Company 
 The Deep Blue Sea  - Rattigan
The Winslow Boy   - Rattigan
Getting On - Alan Bennett
Travesties   - Tom Stoppard
A Delicate Balance  - Edward Albee
Wise Child   - Simon Gray
I Have Been Here Before - J. B. Priestley
The Boy Friend  - Sandy Wilson
Perth Repertory Theatre 
 What Every Woman Knows  - J. M. Barrie
The Odd Couple   - Neil Simon
The Government Inspector   - Gogol
She Stoops to Conquer   - Goldsmith
Bedlam Theatre 
The Jungle Book   - Kipling / Stephen MacDonald

Theatremakers, Stirling
Waiting for Godot - Samuel Beckett
 Stage Company (Scotland) 
The Fall of Kelvin Walker   - Alasdair Gray
 Arts Theatre, Glasgow University - 1965–1972 
The Restoration of Arnold McMillan  - David Storey
The Changeling   - Middleton & Rowley
The Forrigan Reel   - James Bridie
The Man of Mode   - Etherege
The Entertainer   - Osborne
Entertaining Mr Sloane   - Orton
The Cocktail Party   - Eliot
The Shadow of a Gunman   - O'Casey
Play with a Tiger  - Doris Lessing
Uncle Vanya  - Chekhov 
 Selected plays directed
Scottish Theatre Company - The Man of the World - (Macklin)
Pitlochry Festival Theatre - Translations - (Brian Friel), Deadline - (David Huthison) 
Dundee Repertory Theatre - Gigi - (Colette/Loos), Too true to be Good - (Shaw), The Father - (Strindberg), Last of the Red Hot Lovers - (Neil Simon), Sleuth - (Schaffer)
Tron Theatre, Glasgow - Josef and Maria - (Peter Turrini)
Arts Theatre, Glasgow University - Tango- (Mrozek), Shelley - (Ann Jellicoe), Macbeth and New Plays by Eric MacDonald and Joan Ure

Selected filmography
Clay, Smeddum and Greenden (BBC) - (dir. Moira Armstrong) 
Annals of the Parish (BBC) - (dir. Tom Cotter)
The Chiel Amang Us (BBC) - (dir. Tom Cotter & Gordon Menzies)
The Haggard Falcon (BBC) - (dir. Mike Vardy)
The Omega Factor (BBC) - (dir. George Gallaccio)
Burgh Life (BBC) - (dir. Tom Cotter)
Badger by Owl Light (BBC) - (dir. Bob McIntosh)
The Fetch  Scottish Television - (dir. Iain Dalgleish)
City Sugar  (STV) - (dir. Mike Vardy)
Take the High Road (STV) (1982–1995)

Selected radio 

The Doctor's Dilemma - (Shaw) - dir. John Tydeman
The Knocker - (Alan Melville) - dir. John Tydeman
The Idiot - (Doestoevsky)  - dir. Kay Patrick
The Beautiful Garden - dir. Jane Morgan
Peer Gynt - (Ibsen)  dir. Jane Morgan
For the Whale - dir. John Theocharis
Nunaga - dir. John Theocharis
Tusitala and Swift Cloud - dir. Christopher Venning
Hatter's Castle (Cronin) - dir. Stewart Conn
They've taken the Swings Away (Eric MacDonald)- dir. Stewart Conn
Putting it Right - (Eric MacDonald) - dir. Stewart Conn
Annie S. Swan, The People's Friend - dir. Marilyn Imrie
 The Bride of Lammermoor - (Scott) - dir. Marilyn Imrie
Strathinver - (Robin Bell) - dir. John Arnott - Winner of Sony Award 1985
The Bell in the Tree - (Story of Glasgow) - dir. Hamish Wilson
The Horror at Bly - (as Henry James) - dir. Maurice Leitch
Eden Scenes on Chrystal Jed - (as Robert Burns) - dir. Alec Reid
Deacon Brodie - dir. Hamish Wilson
 Audio Books - Scottish and English Classics published by Schiltron and Canongate Books

Photography 
Sing the City, published in 2001, is a collection of Trotter's photographs. They were taken in Glasgow and New York City between 1995 and 1999 and depict the people of both cities. This publication resulted in an exhibition at the Glasgow School of Art in 2004. and the acquisition of much of his work by them and the Scottish National Photography Collection held within the Scottish National Portrait Gallery in Edinburgh.

References

External links 

 
 University of Glasgow Scottish Theatre Archive
 Sing the City
 Most Popular People Born in Dumbarton

1930 births
2013 deaths
People from Dumbarton
Academics of the University of Glasgow
Scottish male stage actors
Scottish male television actors
Scottish male voice actors
20th-century Scottish male actors
21st-century Scottish male actors